A character class is a fundamental part of the identity and nature of characters in the Dungeons & Dragons role-playing game. A character's capabilities, strengths, and weaknesses are largely defined by their class; choosing a class is one of the first steps a player takes to create a Dungeons & Dragons player character. A character's class affects a character's available skills and abilities. A well-rounded party of characters requires a variety of abilities offered by the classes found within the game.

Dungeons & Dragons was the first game to introduce the usage of character classes to role-playing. Many other traditional role-playing games and massively multiplayer online role-playing games have since adopted the concept as well. Dungeons & Dragons classes have generally been defined in the Player's Handbook, one of the three core rulebooks; a variety of alternate classes have also been defined in supplemental sourcebooks.

Classes by type

Principal base classes
These classes have appeared as character classes in the core books of multiple published editions:

 Barbarian
 Bard
 Cleric
 Druid
 Fighter
 Monk
 Paladin
 Ranger
 Rogue
 Sorcerer
 Warlock
 Wizard

Alternative base classes
While the main character classes available have remained fairly consistent since the 1st edition of Advanced Dungeons & Dragons, a variety of alternate base classes have been offered in supplemental books. The release of Unearthed Arcana in 1985, for instance, introduced the base class of Barbarian and reworked Paladins to be a type of the new base class "Cavalier". Oriental Adventures also introduced a number of alternate classes more appropriate for an Eastern setting. The 2nd edition added several completely new base classes (e.g. Runecaster and Shaman); in addition, supplemental handbooks offered a variety of "kits" to customize each base class, and the Dungeon Master's Guide offered rules for creating new character classes. The 3rd edition introduced five classes for use in creating non-player characters in its Dungeon Master's Guide.

Non-core base classes are considered optional and do not always exist in all settings. For example, the Samurai class introduced in the Oriental Adventures book may not make sense in a game set in a standard European-style realm. Similarly, classes associated with psionics such as the Psychic Warrior do not apply to worlds without psionics.

Multiclassing
Most editions of Dungeons & Dragons have allowed for the possibility to either advance in more than one class simultaneously, alternately taking levels in more than one class, or branching out in a second (or more) class at a specific point defined by the first class, a concept generally called multiclassing.

In the 1st and 2nd editions, changing a character's class is difficult. Only those playing as humans can, and it requires extremely high stats to do so. This is called "dual-classing". Non-humans, on the other hand, can "multiclass" where they effectively learn two (or rarely even three) classes at the same time at the cost of a slower character level progression.

The 3rd edition allows players to mix and match levels from any number of classes, though certain combinations are more effective than others. In addition, Prestige classes add more options for multiclassing. This edition offers the most freedom regarding multiclassing. There are, however, penalties to the rate of experience point gained if classes are added haphazardly. The 3rd edition version of Unearthed Arcana includes rules for gestalt characters which combine the advantages of two classes.

The 4th edition allows characters to take a feat that grants access to specific facets of another class. The class-specific multiclass feats are also prerequisites for the power-swap feats, each of which allows the character to swap out a daily, encounter, or utility power from their first class for one from their second class. Also, at level 11, a character with a multiclass feat and all of the power-swap feats is eligible for paragon multiclassing, which allows them to gain additional powers from their second class in lieu of taking a Paragon Path. Some classes are only available through multiclassing; the first such class was Spellscarred, introduced in the Forgotten Realms Player's Guide. In the 4th Edition, each character can only multiclass into a single class, unless otherwise stated by their primary class (such as the Bard). The Player's Handbook III introduced "hybrid" classes, a deeper form of multiclassing in which elements of two classes are combined each level.

In the 5th edition, multiclassing requires minimum ability scores before it can be chosen; however, the requirements are not as steep as in previous editions. The core classes only require an ability score of 13 or greater in the specific requisite score, except for the Monk, Paladin and Ranger (who need 13s in two stats).

Classes by editions

Original Dungeons & Dragons

In the original Dungeons & Dragons boxed set, there were only three main classes: the Cleric, the Fighting man, and the Magic-User. The first supplement, Greyhawk, added the Thief as a fourth main class, as well as the Paladin as a Fighting Man subclass. These four fantasy gaming archetypes represent four major tactical roles in play: the Fighter offers direct combat strength and durability; the Thief offers cunning and stealth; the Cleric provides support in both combat and magic; and the Magic-User has a variety of magical powers. In many ways, other classes are thought of as alternatives that refine or combine these functions. 

Each of the playable races had different amounts of access to the classes.  Dwarves could be Fighters or Fighter/Thieves, with Fighter/Cleric possible for NPCs. Halflings were restricted to the Fighting Man and Thief classes. Elves were restricted to Fighter/Magic-User, Fighter/Magic-User/Thief, and Thief class options, with Fighter/Magic-User/Cleric an option for elven NPCs. Half-Elves (introduced in Greyhawk) could be Fighter/Magic-Users, Fighter/Magic-User/Clerics, or Thieves. All four non-human races had limited level advancement except in the Thief class. Humans could be any single class with no level restriction.

Advanced Dungeons & Dragons 1st edition

Advanced Dungeons & Dragons loosened the restrictions on race and class combinations, although non-human races often had restricted choices among classes and maximum levels they could reach in a class. Additional classes that had first appeared in supplements and articles in The Strategic Review magazine were included as base classes. The Player's Handbook also introduced the bard as a sixth base class; however, its usage in 1st edition was more akin to what would be called a prestige class in later editions, as it was not a legal choice for a starting character. Instead, a character had to start as a fighter, change classes to a thief, and finally switch classes once more to become a bard.

A character's ability scores directly tied into what class choices were legal for them. For instance, a character wishing to be a fighter required at least 9 strength; the more discriminating monk required 15 strength, 15 wisdom, 15 dexterity, and 11 constitution. Unusually high or low ability scores could proscribe class choice further; "too high" an intelligence could prohibit being a fighter, while a charisma of 5 or less would require the character to become an assassin. High ability scores in statistics considered pertinent to the class would grant an experience bonus.

The Player's Handbook brought about other changes in the game and its character classes. Fighters, clerics, and thieves have improved hit dice over the previous edition. The effects of a character's strength score on hit probability, damage, weight allowed, and open doors rolls were changed. High intelligence conferred an increased chance for both spell knowledge and ability to learn languages. A high wisdom score now gave clerics a spell bonus, while low wisdom gave a chance of spell failure. New charts delineated the effects of constitution, dexterity, and charisma. Each of the five main character classes and five sub-classes had its own experience table; for most classes it was now harder to gain promotion above third or fourth levels. Multiclassed characters were also introduced.

Unearthed Arcana added the Cavalier, Barbarian, and Thief-Acrobat classes.

Dungeons & Dragons Basic Set

The second version of the Dungeons & Dragons Basic Set combined the idea of race and class; non-human races did not have classes. Hence, a character might be a (human) Cleric or else simply an "Elf" or "Dwarf". The Basic Set presented four human classes: Cleric, Fighter, Magic User and Thief, and three demi-human classes: Dwarf, Elf, and Halfling. The Companion Set introduced four optional classes for high-level characters: the Avenger, Paladin, and Knight for Fighters, and the Druid for Clerics.  The Master Set introduced one additional class: the Mystic. The Rules Cyclopedia included in its final pages instructions on modifying the Halfling class into a Gnome class, adding that as an option. The Gazetteer series included many optional classes for humans and non-humans, including the shaman (GAZ12) and shamani (GAZ14). Additional human and race classes were also presented in other supplements.

Advanced Dungeons & Dragons 2nd edition

The 2nd edition of Advanced Dungeons & Dragons attempted to streamline what had become a hodgepodge of rules that only applied in specific cases in 1st edition. As such, it sought to simplify the rules and straighten out contradictions. Character classes were divided into four groups or "metaclasses": Warrior, Wizard, Priest, and Rogue. Each of these groups had a "base" class which only required at least a 9 in the "prime requisite" statistic in Fighter, Mage, Cleric, and Thief; these were intended to be playable in any setting. The Player's Handbook went on to say that "all of the other classes are optional." Each group of classes had the same hit dice (determining hit point growth), THAC0 progression, and saving throw table. 2nd edition maintained minimums in certain statistics to qualify for some classes, but removed many of the other restrictions such as one extremely low statistic forcing a character into a specific class.

Changes
Magic-using classes were altered in the 2nd edition. The 2nd edition had two unified spell groups, one for wizard spells and another for priest spells. These lists were then further subdivided by school of magic and sphere of influence, respectively. Different classes had access to different schools or spheres, allowing for each class to have distinct spell lists. 

The illusionist class from 1st edition, for example, became a type of specialist wizard; specialists gained the ability to cast extra spells of their chosen school of magic in exchange for the inability to cast spells of "opposed" schools; an illusionist would gain extra spells per day in the school of illusion, but would be denied access to the schools of abjuration, necromancy, and evocation. 

A similar distinction was made for priests. 2nd edition introduced priests of a specific mythology who would gain their own specific abilities, restrictions, and sphere of influence selection. The druid was provided as an example; the specification of other specialty priests was left to dungeon masters and setting books. As an example, a specialty priest of Tempus, the god of war in the Forgotten Realms campaign setting, can incite a berserker rage in allies and lacks the "only blunt weapons" restriction of normal clerics. The selection of spheres of influence worked similarly to the allowed and forbidden schools of magic. 

The bard class was changed to be a normal class that could be chosen at character creation. The assassin and monk classes were removed from the 2nd edition Player's Handbook. The Dungeon Master's Guide clarified the rationale behind the decision in a section on creating new character classes:

Class-specific supplements for 2nd edition introduced a number of additional class modifications called kits, which allowed players to create characters with particular themes without having to introduce additional classes. The assassin, barbarian, and monk were re-implemented in such fashion.  

Supplemental books introduced new classes. The barbarian returned as a class in the Complete Barbarian's Handbook which also introduced the shaman. The berserker and the runecaster classes appeared in the Viking's Campaign Sourcebook, and the manteis in the Celts Campaign Sourcebook. The psionicist class was introduced in the Complete Psionics Handbook. Campaign settings also introduced new classes, such as the magician and guilder from Birthright, the gladiator and trader from Dark Sun, and the anchorite and arcanist from Ravenloft.

Dungeons & Dragons 3rd edition
The 3rd edition abolished the practice of grouping classes directly, allowing hit dice, attack bonus, and saving throws to vary for each particular class again. 3rd edition also saw the return of the Monk as a base class, the creation of the new Sorcerer class, and the inclusion of Barbarian as a base Player's Handbook class, previously described in 1st edition's Unearthed Arcana rules and as an optional kit in 2nd edition. Statistical requirements on classes and experience bonuses were abolished, though a low score in an important statistic to a class would still adversely affect a character in it.

3rd edition allows for a much more fluid idea of multiclassing than earlier editions, as one unified experience-points-per-level table was made. Rather than earlier editions' rules on splitting experience, characters can simply choose which class they wish to take a new level in and add the appropriate bonus from the class.

Prestige classes were also introduced in the 3rd edition's Dungeon Master's Guide, with new classes only available at higher levels and after meeting several prerequisites.

In addition to the eleven classes presented in the PHB, various alternate base classes were presented in supplements, and the Dungeon Master's Guide presented five weaker classes designed for NPCs (the adept, aristocrat, commoner, expert, and warrior).

Core character classes
The eleven base classes presented in the 3rd edition Player's Handbook are:
Barbarian (Bbn)
Bard (Brd)
Cleric (Clr)
Druid (Drd)
Fighter (Ftr)
Monk (Mnk)
Paladin (Pal)
Ranger (Rgr)
Rogue (Rog)
Sorcerer (Sor)
Wizard (Wiz)

Alternative classes
In addition to class variants for the eleven core classes, many of the supplemental books introduce new base classes that can be taken from first level or multiclassed into, such as the Warlock from Complete Arcane. Some of these books also present prestige classes which have entry requirements only accessible by taking levels in the base classes described in those books (e.g. the Soulcaster prestige class requires the soulmelding class ability, only offered by the three classes in Magic of Incarnum).

Prestige classes
Prestige classes were introduced in 3rd edition as a further means of individualizing a character. They expand upon the form of multiclassing and are inaccessible at first level, specifically meant to be multiclassed into from the base classes. To attain a specific prestige class, a character must first meet a number of prerequisites, such as certain feats or membership in a specific organization. Prestige classes offer a focus on different abilities that may be difficult to attain otherwise; for example, the 3rd edition version of the Assassin prestige class grants minor magical powers, more sneak attack damage, and better usage of poison.

The 3rd edition Dungeon Master's Guide included prestige classes such as the Arcane archer, Blackguard, Mystic Theurge, and Shadowdancer, while the 3.5 revision additionally included classes such as the Arcane Trickster, Archmage, Dragon Disciple, and Duelist. Many other sourcebooks introduced additional prestige classes, such as the Bladesinger in Tome and Blood; Blighter, Geomancer, Shifter, Verdant Lord in Masters of the Wild; Divine Champion in Forgotten Realms Campaign Setting; Cerebremancer and Elocater in Expanded Psionics Handbook; Fochlucan Lyrist in Complete Adventurer; and Chameleon in Races of Destiny. Some of these classes were readjusted for balance in the 3.5 revision of the game.

Dungeons & Dragons 4th edition

Core character classes

The 4th edition heavily retooled the class system in favor of a more unified set of mechanics for characters, which was in part intended to reduce some of the perceived imbalance between spellcasters and non-spellcasters in the 3rd edition. Classes can be defined as the combination of a character role with a power source and are differentiated by what active-use class features and powers they give, all of which follow the same pattern of at-will, once per encounter, once daily, and utility powers.

The 4th edition Player's Handbook does not include some classes from 3rd edition, such as the Barbarian, Bard, Druid, Monk, and Sorcerer (though these classes returned in the second and third volumes of the Player's Handbook), but does include the Warlock (originally introduced the v3.5 sourcebook Complete Arcane) and Warlord (originally introduced as the Marshal in the 3rd edition Miniatures Handbook) which had not appeared in the Player's Handbook in previous editions. Twenty-six classes were released in total.

Power sources
Different classes draw on different power sources for their abilities. The power sources used by the Player's Handbook classes are arcane, divine, and martial. Arcane classes gain magical energy from the cosmos, divine classes receive their power from the gods, and martial classes draw power from training and willpower. The Player's Handbook 2 introduces the primal power source, which draws power from the spirits of the natural world and features transformation as a theme. Dragon No. 379 included the Assassin class, introducing the shadow power source. The Player's Handbook 3 introduced the psionic power source, which draws power from the mind. Player's Option: Heroes of the Elemental Chaos introduced builds that use the elemental power source.

Character roles
Characters of a given class are said to fill a particular role in the party, especially in combat. Leaders are focused on buffing and healing allies. Controllers focus on affecting multiple targets at once, either damaging or debuffing them, or altering the battlefield's terrain. Defenders focus on blocking attacking enemies or drawing their attacks to themselves and are typically focused on melee combat. Strikers are focused on mobility, dealing heavy damage to single targets and avoiding attacks. While some Leader and Striker classes and builds are focused towards either melee or ranged combat, the roles as a whole are not.

Paragon paths and epic destinies
The optional prestige classes from earlier editions have instead been replaced by paragon paths and epic destinies as methods of character customization. Each character may choose a paragon path upon reaching the paragon tier at level 11 and an epic destiny upon reaching the epic tier at level 21.

Paragon paths are often (though not always) class-specific, and some have additional prerequisites. Other paragon paths are restricted to members of a certain race or are associated with a nation or faction in a campaign setting. Paragon paths generally expand on a character's existing abilities. For example, fighter paragon paths improve a character's toughness, resilience, or damage with melee weapons.

Epic destinies generally have looser prerequisites than paragon paths; many are available to multiple classes, and some, such as Demigod and Eternal Seeker, have 21st level as their only prerequisite. Each epic destiny includes at least one way in which a character can establish a legacy and at least one way in which a character can retire. Most epic destinies provide fewer benefits than paragon paths, but the benefits that they provide are far more powerful. A common feature of an epic destiny is to allow characters to (usually once per day) return to life or otherwise continue to function after dying.

Unlike prestige classes, a character may only take a single paragon path and a single epic destiny, and path and destiny advancement is in addition to class advancement rather than being in lieu of it.

Dungeons & Dragons 5th edition
Classes in the 5th edition are mechanically and thematically similar to the versions in the 3rd edition. Classes gain new abilities as they reach each level, allowing them to combat stronger monsters and more difficult perilous situations, but unlike 4th edition, lower-level opponents remain threatening as power levels do not scale in tandem.

Classes
There are 12 classes included in the 5th edition Player's Handbook (2014). The first new character class, the Artificer, for the 5th edition was introduced in Eberron: Rising from the Last War (2019), and included in Tasha's Cauldron of Everything (2020).

Subclasses
Each class in the Player's Handbook (2014) has multiple subclasses, which allow players to choose an archetype of their class they want to follow (e.g. the Berserker Barbarian, the Evoker Wizard, the Wild Magic Sorcerer, the Beastmaster Ranger, etc.), chosen at 3rd level or earlier. This archetype defines many of the abilities that the class receives. The Dungeon Master's Guide (2014) includes two nonstandard subclass options for evil characters that are only allowed in the game by permission of the Dungeon Master: the Death Cleric and the Oathbreaker Paladin.

Additional subclasses have been added to the game with the publication of various sourcebooks and campaign guidebooks, for example, in supplements such as the Sword Coast Adventurer's Guide (2015), Xanathar's Guide to Everything (2017) and Tasha's Cauldron of Everything (2020).

Subclasses in 5th Edition sourcebooks

Subclasses in 5th Edition campaign & setting books

Reception 
In an article comparing the 1978 Player's Handbook and the 2014 Player's Handbook, James Floyd Kelly, for GeekDad, highlighted that the earlier edition had inconsistencies in leveling across the different character classes. Floyd Kelly wrote: "For all of the classes, the XP chart for leveling varied. Paladins required 350,000XP after level 11, while Fighters only required 250,000XP after the same level. Poor Magic-Users, though… after level 18 each additional level came at a price of 375,000XP while the Illusionist could rock after level 12 with a requirement of only 220,000XP per additional level. Oh, and the Monk had to stop at level 17. No further advancement".

Shannon Appelcline, author of Designers & Dragons, highlighted that while OD&D only had three character classes, "which made it easy to balance a party", "as character classes proliferated in later editions, it became less clear which classes could fill which roles". The 4th Edition classes were designed for specific party roles and these "classes were unified in how they were defined and how they progressed. [...] The difference in the character classes now focused on what powers they had and what they could do". Appelcline wrote that the addition of warlock and warlord to the 4th Edition base classes was "surprising" and "with so many new races and classes, it's not surprising that some classics got dropped. The [...] assassin, bard, and druid were all classics that were missing from the class list. This generated even more controversy, and the designers later said that they regretted not saying that the first Player's Handbook was just a starting place for D&D 4E".

In the AV Club's review of the 5th Edition, Samantha Nelson wrote: "Just like in 4th Edition, there are several versions of each class, which provide a high level of diversity in the party. [...] But the different character classes play far more like 3.5 than 4th Edition. [...] Many of the classes have been radically improved. There isn't a single leveling up where the only benefit is a few more hit points. Each new benchmark unlocks some new component of your class, rewarding your dedication to one path over the course of the game’s 20 levels".

In SLUG Magazine's review of the 5th Edition Player's Handbook (2014), Henry Glasheen wrote: "I didn't feel like any race was unduly pidgeonholed into one class or another [...]. Classes are deeper now, with more meaningful customization options and a more modest progression. Multiclassing is still available, but it seems like the development team has found a way to balance the overpowered multiclassing opportunities of D&D 3.5 while avoiding the convoluted clusterfuck that was multiclassing in 4th Edition. In most cases, you'll want to stick to your starting class, but there are some interesting multiclass builds that I certainly want to try out".

Screen Rant rated the wizard class as the most powerful class and the ranger class as the least powerful of the base 12 character classes in 5th Edition.

Gus Wezerek, for FiveThirtyEight, reported that of the 5th edition "class and race combinations per 100,000 characters that players created on D&D Beyond from" August 15 to September 15, 2017, fighters were the most created at 13,906 total, followed by rogues (11,307) and wizards (9,855). Druids were the least created at 6,328 total. Wezerek wrote "When I started playing 'Dungeons & Dragons' five years ago, I never would have chosen the game's most popular match: the human fighter. There are already enough human fighters in movies, TV and books — my first character was an albino dragonborn sorcerer. But these days I can get behind the combo's simplicity".

In popular culture

Television 
 In the American science fiction horror television series Stranger Things, a Dungeons and Dragons game played by the main characters is one of the first scenes of the show and the game reappears throughout the show. In 2019, Wizards of the Coast released a 5th Edition Stranger Things-themed starter set that includes "five pre-generated characters, one each for the five members of the party as described in Stranger Things Season 2. Fans can step into the shoes of Mike's paladin, Will's cleric, Lucas' ranger, Dustin's bard, and Eleven's wizard".

References

External links
 System Reference Document: OGL information on D&D classes (for 3rd Edition)
System Reference Document: OGL information on D&D classes (for 5th Edition)